The 52nd Sikhs (Frontier Force) was an infantry regiment of the British Indian Army. It was raised in 1846 as the 2nd Regiment of Infantry The Frontier Brigade. It was designated as the 52nd Sikhs (Frontier Force) in 1903 and became 2nd Battalion (Sikhs) 12th Frontier Force Regiment in 1922. In 1947, it was allocated to the Pakistan Army, where it continues to exist as 4th Battalion The Frontier Force Regiment.

Early history
The regiment was raised on 22 December 1846 at Kangra as the 2nd Regiment of Infantry The Frontier Brigade by Major JWV Stephen. It was composed mostly of Dogras, with some Pathans and Gurkhas, which prompted its title of 'Hill Corps'. In 1847, it was designated 2nd (or Hill) Regiment of Sikh Local Infantry, becoming the 2nd (or Hill) Regiment of Sikh Infantry in 1857. In 1851, the regiment became part of the Punjab Irregular Force, which later became famous as the Punjab Frontier Force or The Piffers. The Piffers consisted of five regiments of cavalry, eleven regiments of infantry and five batteries of artillery besides the Corps of Guides. Their mission was to maintain order on the Punjab Frontier; a task they performed with great aplomb. The 2nd Sikh Infantry took part in numerous frontier operations besides the Second Sikh War of 1848-49 and the Great Indian Mutiny of 1857–58, when it served in Hazara and Murree Hills. During the Second Afghan War of 1878–80, the regiment fought in the Battles of Ahmad Khel and Kandahar. In 1902, it went to British Somaliland to suppress the resistance movement led by Diiriye Guure of the Dervish State.

52nd Sikhs (Frontier Force)
Subsequent to the reforms brought about in the Indian Army by Lord Kitchener in 1903, the regiment's designation was changed to 52nd  Sikhs (Frontier Force). In 1914, the regiment's class composition was three companies of Dogras, two each of Pathans and Sikhs, and one of Punjabi Muslims. During First World War, the regiment joined the 18th Indian Division in Mesopotamia in 1917 and fought in the Battle of Sharqat. It moved to Kurdistan in 1919 and took part in suppressing the Iraqi Revolt of 1920.

Subsequent History
After the First World War, the 52nd Sikhs were grouped with the 51st, 53rd and 54th Sikhs, and the two battalions of Guides Infantry to form the 12th Frontier Force Regiment in 1922. The 52nd Sikhs became 2nd Battalion (Sikhs) of the new regiment. During the Second World War, 2 FF fought with distinction in the Malayan Campaign, where its Commanding Officer Lieutenant Colonel Arthur Edward Cumming, was awarded the Victoria Cross for outstanding valour. The battalion was captured by the Japanese after the British surrender at Singapore in February 1942. It was re-raised in 1946. In 1947, the Frontier Force Regiment was allotted to Pakistan Army. 2 FF was back in action in 1948, when it fought in the Kashmir War against India. In 1956, the Frontier Force Rifles and the Pathan Regiment were merged with the Frontier Force Regiment, and 2 FF was redesignated as 4 FF. During the Indo-Pakistan War of 1965, the battalion fought in the Sialkot Sector, while during the Indo-Pakistan War of 1971, it fought with great courage in the Battle of Hilli in East Pakistan. For exceptional valour, Major Muhammad Akram and Major Shabbir Sharif were awarded the Nishan-i-Haider, Pakistan's highest gallantry award.

Genealogy
1846 2nd Regiment of Infantry The Frontier Brigade
1847 2nd (or Hill) Regiment of Sikh Local Infantry
1857 2nd (or Hill) Regiment of Sikh Infantry
1857 2nd (or Hill) Regiment of Sikh Infantry, Punjab Irregular Force
1865 2nd (or Hill) Regiment of Sikh Infantry, Punjab Frontier Force
1901 2nd (or Hill) Sikh Infantry
1903 52nd Sikhs (Frontier Force)
1922 2nd Battalion (Sikhs) 12th Frontier Force Regiment
1945 2nd Battalion (Sikhs) The Frontier Force Regiment
1947 2nd Battalion The Frontier Force Regiment
1956 4th Battalion The Frontier Force Regiment

References

Further reading
 May, Capt CW. (1933). History of the 2nd Sikhs, 12th Frontier Force Regt 1846-1933. Jubblepore: Mission Press.
 The Historical Record of the 2nd (or Hill) Sikh Infantry Punjab Frontier Force. (1888). Lahore: Punjab Government.
 Condon, Brig WEH. (1962). The Frontier Force Regiment, Aldershot: Gale & Polden Ltd.
 North, REFG. (1934). The Punjab Frontier Force: A Brief Record of Their Services 1846-1924. DI Khan: Commercial Steam Press.
 Jafar Ali Khan, Maj Gen M. (1950). One Hundred Glorious Years: A History of the Punjab Frontier Force, 1849-1949. Lahore: Civil and Military Gazette Press.
 Dey, RSBN. (1905). A Brief Account of the Late Punjab Frontier Force, From its Organization in 1849 to its Re-distribution on 31st March 1903. Calcutta.
 Attiqur Rahman, Lt Gen M. (1980). The Wardens of the Marches – A History of the Piffers 1947-71. Lahore: Wajidalis.
 Khan, Maj Muhammad Nawaz. (1996). The Glorious Piffers 1843-1995. Abbottabad: The Frontier Force Regimental Centre.
 Gaylor, John. (1991). Sons of John Company: The Indian and Pakistan Armies 1903- 1991. Stroud: Spellmount. 
Barthorp, M, and Burn, J. (1979). Indian Infantry Regiments 1860-1914. London: Osprey. 
Sumner, Ian. (2001). The Indian Army 1914-1947. London: Osprey.

See also
The Frontier Force Regiment
12th Frontier Force Regiment
Punjab Irregular Force

British Indian Army infantry regiments
Frontier Force Regiment
Military units and formations established in 1846
1846 establishments in British India